Fabricio Javier Benítez Piriz (born 11 June 1975) is a former Guatemalan football midfielder and manager. He is currently the manager for Liga Nacional club Mixco. Of Uruguayan descent, he is the son of Raul Washington Benitez Touzet, a famous Uruguayan player who played in the decade of the 70's and 80's in Guatemala, and son of Teresita Gladyz Piriz Nuñes, also Uruguayan.  He has a younger sister, Jessica Benitez, and an older brother, Eduardo Benitez.  He made his debut as a striker in C.D Panzos in 1990

Club career
Benítez has played for Cobán Imperial, Marquense and Antigua at Guatemala's highest level before joining Suchitepéquez in 2007. He was put on the Suchi transfer list in May 2010.

International career
He made his debut for Guatemala in a February 1998 CONCACAF Gold Cup Finals match against Jamaica and has earned a total of 19 caps, scoring no goals. He has represented his country in 7 FIFA World Cup qualification matches and played at the 2003 UNCAF Nations Cup as well as at the 1998 and 2002 CONCACAF Gold Cups.

His final international was a February 2003 UNCAF Nations Cup match against Honduras.

References

External links

1975 births
Living people
Sportspeople from Guatemala City
Guatemalan footballers
Guatemala international footballers
1998 CONCACAF Gold Cup players
2002 CONCACAF Gold Cup players
2003 UNCAF Nations Cup players
Deportivo Marquense players
C.D. Suchitepéquez players
Antigua GFC players
Association football midfielders